Gordon Price is a Canadian urban planner and a former politician, who was an NPA member of Vancouver City Council, serving six terms from 1986 to 2002. He was the first openly gay member of Vancouver City Council. Since retiring from politics, Price writes, teaches and consults on urban development and planning issues.

Price first became prominent when he organized a campaign involving citizen street patrols against street prostitution in his West End Vancouver neighbourhood. As a politician, he also served on the board of the Greater Vancouver Regional District (Metro Vancouver) and the board of TransLink.

After retiring from politics, Price became a writer and public lecturer on urban renewal and transportation planning issues. He wrote a column for the magazine Business in Vancouver. He is the former director of the CITY Program, a continuing education program in urban planning and sustainable community development at Simon Fraser University.  In 2009, he was appointed by Gregor Robertson, the Mayor of Vancouver, to the city's "Greenest City Action Team".

References

Non-Partisan Association councillors
Canadian urban planners
Gay politicians
Canadian gay writers
LGBT municipal councillors in Canada
Academic staff of Simon Fraser University
Year of birth missing (living people)
Living people
20th-century Canadian politicians
20th-century Canadian LGBT people
21st-century Canadian politicians
21st-century Canadian LGBT people